Entypesa is a genus of African mygalomorph spiders in the family Entypesidae. It was first described by Eugène Louis Simon in 1902. Originally placed with the curtain-web spiders, it was transferred to the funnel-web trapdoor spiders in 1985, then to the Entypesidae in 2020. It is a senior synonym of Pseudohermacha.

Species
 it contains six species, found in South Africa and on Madagascar:
Entypesa andohahela Zonstein, 2018 – Madagascar
Entypesa enakara Zonstein, 2018 – Madagascar
Entypesa fisheri Zonstein, 2018 – Madagascar
Entypesa nebulosa Simon, 1902 (type) – Madagascar
Entypesa rastellata Zonstein, 2018 – Madagascar
Entypesa schoutedeni Benoit, 1965 – South Africa

Nomen dubium
E. annulipes (Strand, 1907)

See also
 List of Entypesidae species

References

Further reading

Mygalomorphae genera
Entypesidae
Spiders of Madagascar
Spiders of South Africa